The 2022–23 ABA League Second Division is the 6th season of the ABA Second Division with 14 teams from Bosnia and Herzegovina, Croatia, Montenegro, North Macedonia, Serbia, and Slovenia participating in it.

Clubs 
A total of 14 clubs contest the league for the 2022–23 season, based on the results in the domestic championships and taking into consideration the results in the previous season. On the ABA Assembly session, held on 19 July 2022 in Zagreb, was confirmed clubs for the 2022–23 season.

Distribution
The following is the access list for this season.

Club allocation 

The labels in the parentheses show how each team qualified for the place of its starting round:
 1st–5th: Positions in national leagues at the end of season.
 WC: Wild card

Bosnian clubs Leotar and Sloboda Tuzla failed to receive wildcards.

Personnel and sponsorship

Coaching changes

Regular season
The Regular season is split in five tournaments featuring two or three rounds.

League table

Playoffs

Based on the results and position of the clubs in the standings after the regular season, Playoffs will take place with teams from 1st to 8th position. The Quarterfinals will be played in knockout pairs 1–8, 2–7, 3–6, 4–5. The winners of the Quarterfinals will qualify to the Semifinals and the winners of the Semifinals will play the Final.

Bracket
Knock-out elimination phases were played under single-game format.

Clubs in European competitions

See also 
 List of current ABA League Second Division team rosters
 2022–23 ABA League First Division

 2022–23 domestic competitions
  2022–23 Basketball Championship of Bosnia and Herzegovina
  2022–23 HT Premijer liga
  2022–23 Prva A liga
  2022–23 Macedonian First League
  2022–23 Basketball League of Serbia
  2022–23 Slovenian Basketball League

Notes

References

External links 
 Official website
 ABA League at Eurobasket.com

ABA Second Division seasons
Adriatic
2022–23 in European basketball leagues
2022–23 in Bosnia and Herzegovina basketball
2022–23 in Croatian basketball
2022–23 in Montenegrin basketball
2022–23 in Serbian basketball
2022–23 in Slovenian basketball
ABA